Silene multinervia is a species of flowering plant in the family Caryophyllaceae known by the common name manynerve catchfly.

It is native to the coastal hills and mountain ranges of California and Baja California, where it grows in chaparral and other local habitat.

Silene multinervia is an annual herb producing a hairy, glandular, erect stem to a maximum height near . Flowers occur in a terminal cyme at the top of the stem, as well as in some of the leaf axils. Each is encapsulated in a hairy calyx of fused sepals which is lined with many veins, more than the 10 that many other Silene have. The five petals are white to pink and have small notches in their tips.

Like many chaparral plants, this species is adapted to wildfire-prone conditions. Its seeds are strongly stimulated to germinate when exposed to smoke.

References

External links
Jepson Manual Treatment: Silene multinervia
USDA Plants Profile
U.C. Photos gallery: Silene multinervia

multinervia
Flora of Baja California
Flora of California
Natural history of the California chaparral and woodlands
Natural history of the California Coast Ranges
Natural history of the Peninsular Ranges
Natural history of the San Francisco Bay Area
Natural history of the Santa Monica Mountains
Natural history of the Transverse Ranges
Flora without expected TNC conservation status